Time's List of the 100 Best Novels is an unranked list of the 100 best novels published in the English language between 1923 and 2005. The list was compiled by Time Magazine critics Lev Grossman and Richard Lacayo.

The list includes only novels published between 1923 (when Time was first published) and 2005 (when the list was compiled). As a result, some notable 20th-century novels, such as Ulysses by James Joyce (published in 1922), were ineligible for inclusion.

A list of the ten best graphic novels of the period was subsequently published as a supplement to the list. Watchmen (1986) by Alan Moore and Dave Gibbons appears on both the 100 Best Novels and 10 Best Graphic Novels lists, giving the combined lists a total of 109 entries.

See also
''Le Monde'''s 100 Books of the Century
Time's List of the 10 Best Graphic Novels
Time's All-Time 100 Movies

References

External links
 List Description at Time.com
 Full List at Time.com 
 List description of the 10 best Graphic Novels at Time.com

Time (magazine) 100 Lists
Lists of novels
Top book lists